Kerryn Peterson (née Harrington, born 2 March 1992) is an Australian rules footballer and former basketballer. Peterson currently plays for the Carlton Football Club in the AFL Women's (AFLW), and previously played for the Bendigo Spirit, Australian Institute of Sport, Bulleen Boomers and Adelaide Lightning in the Women's National Basketball League (WNBL) between 2007 and 2017. She is a three-time AFL Women's All-Australian. Peterson served as Carlton co-captain from 2020 to 2021, and has served as the sole captain since the 2022 season.

Basketball career

WNBL
Peterson began her WNBL career in the inaugural year of the Bendigo Spirit alongside the likes of Kristi Harrower. She would then spend the next three seasons in between the AIS and Bendigo. She then had a two-season stint in Bulleen. After a one-year absence from the league, she returned playing for the Adelaide Lightning. For the 2015–16 season she returned to Bendigo. Peterson was re-signed by the Spirit, for the 2016–17 season.

National team
Peterson was a consistent member of the Gems. She was then named to the Gems squad and helped them take home the Gold at the Oceania Under-18 Championship and qualify for the World Championship the following year in Thailand. Playing alongside Elizabeth Cambage, the team placed fifth. She would once again represent the Gems, and despite all their best efforts, was one step closer to the podium, but fell short to Brazil, placing fourth.

AFL Women's career
On 16 May 2017,  signed Peterson and Maddison Gay to Carlton's rookie list for the 2018 AFL Women's season. Following their impressive development, the pair were promoted to the senior list on 1 September 2017. The 2020 AFL Women's season saw Peterson obtain her second AFL Women's All-Australian team selection, named in the half-back position.

Statistics
Updated to the end of S7 (2022).

|-
| 2018 ||  || 9
| 7 || 0 || 0 || 34 || 20 || 54 || 15 || 24 || 0.0 || 0.0 || 4.9 || 2.9 || 7.7 || 2.1 || 3.4 || 0
|-
| 2019 ||  || 9
| 9 || 0 || 0 || 86 || 31 || 117 || 28 || 11 || 0.0 || 0.0 || 9.6 || 3.4 || 13.0 || 3.1 || 1.2 || 3 
|-
| 2020 ||  || 9
| 7 || 0 || 0 || 62 || 34 || 96 || 31 || 13 || 0.0 || 0.0 || 8.9 || 4.9 || 13.7 || 4.4 || 1.9 || 0
|-
| 2021 ||  || 9
| 9 || 1 || 0 || 83 || 49 || 132 || 25 || 26 || 0.1 || 0.0 || 9.2 || 5.4 || 14.7 || 2.8 || 2.9 || 1
|-
| 2022 ||  || 9
| 10 || 0 || 0 || 97 || 46 || 143 || 35 || 24 || 0.0 || 0.0 || 9.7 || 4.6 || 14.3 || 3.5 || 2.4 || 3
|-
| S7 (2022) ||  || 9
| 10 || 3 || 1 || 82 || 62 || 144 || 32 || 41 || 0.3 || 0.1 || 8.2 || 6.2 || 14.4 || 3.2 || 4.1 || 2
|- class=sortbottom
! colspan=3 | Career
! 52 !! 4 !! 1 !! 444 !! 242 !! 686 !! 166 !! 139 !! 0.1 !! 0.0 !! 8.5 !! 4.7 !! 13.2 !! 3.2 !! 2.7 !! 9
|}

Personal life
Peterson married her partner, ABC Sport journalist Joel Peterson, in May 2022.

Honours and achievements
 Carlton captain: 2020– (co-captain 2020–2021)
 3× AFL Women's All-Australian team: 2019, 2020, 2022

References

External links

 
 
 

1992 births
Living people
Australian women's basketball players
Sportswomen from Victoria (Australia)
Australian rules footballers from Victoria (Australia)
Carlton Football Club (AFLW) players
Guards (basketball)